Paschal Hickman (c. 1778 – January 23, 1813) was an American military officer who was killed in the Massacre of the River Raisin, an important event in the War of 1812. Hickman County, Kentucky is named for him.

Hickman was born in King and Queen County, Virginia, a son of famous Baptist preacher Reverend William Hickman and his wife Elizabeth Shackelford. William Hickman, a veteran of the Indian Wars as well as of the Revolutionary War, is said to have preached the first Christian sermon in Kentucky.

Paschal Hickman served as a private under Gen. Anthony Wayne at the Battle of Fallen Timbers in 1794. He was an ensign in the 22d Regiment of the Kentucky Militia in 1802, and a lieutenant in 1803. Hickman married Elizabeth Hall in 1797; he and his wife had three daughters and made their home in Frankfort. He was the jailer of Franklin County for some years.

In August 1812, shortly after the beginning of the War of 1812, Hickman raised a company for Col. John Allen's 1st Kentucky Rifle Regiment and served as its Captain. The regiment served in the campaign under Gen. James Winchester against British Gen. Henry Procter and the Shawnee leader Tecumseh. Hickman was seriously wounded in the American victory at the First Battle of Frenchtown on January 18, 1813 and both of his legs had to be amputated. On January 22, the main British force arrived and Winchester was defeated and captured. Fearing the American army under Gen. William Henry Harrison would now move against him, Procter retreated the next day, taking the uninjured prisoners with him and leaving the seriously wounded behind. No sooner had Procter departed than his Indian allies massacred the American wounded. Paschal Hickman was reportedly dragged from a house and tomahawked to death. At least 68 other Kentuckians also died in the massacre.

"Remember the Raisin" became a rallying cry for American troops and the United States for the remainder of the war.

In 1822, Hickman County, Kentucky was formed and named in honor of Paschal Hickman. Eight other Kentucky counties are also named for officers who died in the battle or the following massacre.

References

External links
List of American dead at the Battle of Frenchtown and the River Raisin massacre
The Battles of the River Raisin
Reenacting Unit - 1st Kentucky Rifle Regiment, Captain Hickman's Company (includes a detailed Company history of the Battle of Frenchtown)

1813 deaths
Baptist ministers from the United States
American military personnel killed in the War of 1812
People from King and Queen County, Virginia
American people of the Northwest Indian War
Year of birth uncertain
People from Kentucky in the War of 1812
Baptists from Virginia